Jonathan Stuart Abramowitz (born June 11, 1969) is an American clinical psychologist and Professor in the Department of Psychology and Neuroscience at the University of North Carolina at Chapel Hill (UNC-CH). He is an expert on obsessive-compulsive disorder (OCD) and anxiety disorders whose work is highly cited. He maintains a research lab and serves as the Director of the UNC-CH Anxiety and Stress Disorders Clinic. Abramowitz approaches the understanding and treatment of psychological problems from a cognitive-behavioral perspective.

Academic career

Abramowitz earned his B.A. in Psychology from Muhlenberg College in 1991, his M.A. in Psychology from Bucknell University in 1993, and his Ph.D. in Clinical Psychology from the University of Memphis in 1998. He completed both a predoctoral internship and postdoctoral fellowship at the Center for Treatment and Study of Anxiety at the University of Pennsylvania. He was a staff psychologist and Associate Professor at the Mayo Clinic (Rochester, Minnesota) from 2000 until 2006. He moved to North Carolina in the summer of 2006.

Abramowitz's research focuses on the development and evaluation of cognitive-behavioral treatments (CBT) for OCD and other anxiety-related problems, as well as on understanding the nature and psychopathology of these problems. He is the author of approximately 300 publications, including more than 10 books and over 250 peer reviewed journal articles and book chapters. He has also worked extensively as a book and journal editor. Abramowitz has given invited lectures around the world and served in numerous editorial and advisory roles for scientific journals and organizations.

Abramowitz is board certified by the American Board of Behavioral Psychology and is a licensed psychologist in North Carolina. In his clinical practice, he specializes in providing outpatient consultation and cognitive-behavioral treatment of OCD and other anxiety-related problems.

Research areas and contributions

Treatment of OCD and anxiety: A major focus of Abramowitz's research is the treatment of OCD. His work primarily addresses exposure and response prevention (ERP; a form of cognitive-behavioral therapy [CBT]) and he has conducted treatment outcome studies and meta-analytic reviews of this therapy. He has also investigated factors that predict good and poor outcomes.

Abramowitz has helped to develop an OCD treatment program combining ERP with Acceptance and Commitment Therapy (ACT). He has also helped to develop couple-based ERP programs for OCD and Body Dysmorphic Disorder.

Abramowitz has written about, and is conducting research to better understand, how to enhance the outcome of exposure therapy/ERP by optimizing extinction learning. This work is drawn from inhibitory learning models of exposure.

Nature and symptoms of OCD: Abramowitz's research also focuses on trying to understand the complex symptomatology of OCD. His work has identified 4 subtypes/dimensions of this disorder that involve somewhat distinct cognitive and behavioral phenomena: (a) contamination, (b) responsibility for harm/mistakes, (c) unacceptable thoughts, and (d) incompleteness/symmetry. He has also contributed to the re-conceptualization of hoarding as separate from OCD.

Abramowitz has argued that OCD symptoms lie on a continuum with normal everyday experiences, and that one’s learning history (and to a lesser extent, their biology) influence the frequency, intensity, and duration of OCD symptoms. He has also criticized the DSM-5’s re-classification of OCD as separate from the anxiety disorders and as overlapping with conditions such as Hair Pulling Disorder and Skin Picking Disorder. Abramowitz is generally critical of biomedical models which view problems such as OCD and anxiety as brain diseases or genetic disorders.

Assessment of OCD: Abramowitz led a team of researchers in 2010 that developed the Dimensional Obsessive-Compulsive Scale (DOCS), a 20-item self-report instrument designed to measure the severity of the four types of OCD symptoms (see above). The DOCS has been translated into multiple languages for use worldwide.

Cognitive-behavioral factors and models of OCD and anxiety: The cognitive-behavioral model is the leading conceptual approach to understanding OCD and anxiety disorders. Abramowitz conducts cross-sectional, experimental, and prospective (longitudinal) research that has helped to clarify and advance this conceptual model. His work focuses on cognitive biases such as anxiety sensitivity, thought-action fusion, intolerance of uncertainty, and attentional biases that factor in the persistence of OCD and irrational fear. With his team at UNC, he has developed experimental paradigms for studying thought-action fusion and intolerance of uncertainty. His work has also demonstrated that cognitive factors prospectively predict the escalation of intrusive thoughts into obsessions.

Abramowitz also conducts studies on cognitive-behavioral factors in other anxiety and related problems, including health/illness anxiety, shy bladder syndrome, panic disorder, and hoarding.

Scrupulosity: Abramowitz has conducted studies on, and developed a cognitive-behavioral model of, scrupulosity (religious obsessions and compulsions). He also developed the Penn Inventory of Scrupulosity (PIOS) to measure this phenomenon.

Prevention of postpartum OCD: Abramowitz developed and evaluated a prevention program for OCD symptoms in new parents. This work was derived from previous studies led by Abramowitz showing that certain types of cognitive/psychological phenomena (such as the tendency to catastrophically misinterpret unwanted thoughts) predict the development of OCD symptoms in the postpartum. The prevention program, known as "Baby PREP", can be delivered as part of perinatal education classes and was shown to be more effective than a credible placebo control program in preventing OCD symptoms among vulnerable expecting/new parents.

Cross-cultural factors: Abramowitz has conducted research on cultural, religious, and racial differences in the expression of anxiety and OCD symptoms and related phenomena. He is part of a multi-national collaborative effort studying the nature of intrusive obsessional thoughts in cultures and countries around the world.

Awards, recognition, and leadership

Abramowitz's contributions to the fields of OCD, anxiety disorders, and clinical psychology are recognized by his colleagues, peers, and the media through numerous honors, awards, and appearances. He is a Fellow and Past President of the Association for Behavioral and Cognitive Therapies (ABCT) and serves on the International OCD Foundation Scientific and Clinical Advisory Board. He is the recipient of a Muhlenberg College Alumni Achievement Award, the David Shakow Early Career Award for Outstanding Contributions to the Science and Practice of Clinical Psychology (from Division 12 of the American Psychological Association), and the Mayo Clinic Department of Psychiatry and Psychology Outstanding Contributions to Research Award.

Abramowitz has served on the Editorial Boards of several scientific journals and as Associate Editor of Journal of Cognitive Psychotherapy (2008–present) and Associate Editor of Behaviour Research and Therapy (2006-2015). He is the Editor-in-Chief of the Journal of Obsessive-Compulsive and Related Disorders. His ResearchGate score is higher than 97.5% of this site's members.

Abramowitz was invited by colleagues in Norway to help train and supervise 30 OCD treatment teams in that country. The training is part of an initiative funded by the Norwegian government to ensure that all individuals with OCD in Norway have access to effective treatment.

Abramowitz has twice been appointed as Associate Chair of the University of North Carolina at Chapel Hill Department of Psychology and Neuroscience, a position he held from 2007-2017.

Personal life
Abramowitz lives in Chapel Hill, North Carolina, with his wife and two daughters.

Selected works

Books
 Abramowitz, J. S. (2006).  Understanding and treating obsessive-compulsive disorder: A cognitive-behavioral approach. Mahwah, NJ: Lawrence Erlbaum Associates, Inc. 
 Abramowitz, J. S., Taylor, S., & McKay, D. (Eds.) (2008).  Clinical handbook of obsessive-compulsive disorder and related problems.  Baltimore, MD: The Johns Hopkins University Press. 
 Abramowitz, J. S. (2012). The stress less workbook: Simple strategies to relieve pressure, manage commitments, and minimize conflicts. New York: Guilford Press. 
 Abramowitz, J. S. & Jacoby, R. J. (2015). Obsessive-compulsive disorder in adults: Advances in Psychotherapy—Evidence-based practice. Boston: Hogrefe Publishing. 
 Abramowitz, J. S., McKay, D., & Storch, E. A. (Eds.) (2017). The Wiley handbook of obsessive-compulsive disorders. Hoboken, NJ: Wiley. 
Abramowitz, J. S. (2018). Getting over OCD: A 10-step workbook for taking back your life (2nd edition). New York: Guilford Press. 
Abramowitz, J. S., Deacon, B. J., & Whiteside, S. P. (2019). Exposure therapy for anxiety: Principles and practice (2nd ed). New York: Guilford Press. 
Abramowitz, J. S., & Blakey, S. M. (2020). Clinical handbook of fear and anxiety: Maintenance processes and treatment mechanisms. Washington DC: American Psychological Association.

Journal articles

External links
 Abramowitz's laboratory webpage
 Abramowitz's personal website

References

21st-century American psychologists
American clinical psychologists
American neuroscientists
1969 births
Scientists from Baltimore
Muhlenberg College alumni
Bucknell University alumni
University of Memphis alumni
University of Pennsylvania alumni
University of North Carolina at Chapel Hill faculty
Living people
Obsessive–compulsive disorder researchers